Charlotte Elizabeth Ferguson-Davie  (1880 – 24 March 1943) was a British physician and the founder of the St. Andrew's Medical Mission and the St. Andrew Mission Hospital, the first women's and children's clinic in Singapore.

Biography 
Ferguson-Davie was born in Essex, the daughter of Irish geologist Edward Hull, and she went on to become a medical doctor. In 1902, she married the Anglican Right Reverend Charles James Ferguson-Davie. Ferguson-Davie and her husband came to Singapore in 1909. Prior to coming to Singapore, she had worked in India as a medical missionary.

In 1913, she helped create the St. Andrew Medical Mission in order to help care for the "poor and disadvantaged." She opened a second clinic in 1914. In 1921, she published a book, In Rubber Lands: An Account of the Work of the Church in Malaya.

In 1923, she created the first women's and children's clinic in Singapore, named the St. Andrew's Mission Hospital (SAMH). She was able to obtain the land and get architects to work for her for almost "nothing." The next year, in 1924, Ferguson-Davie expanded the services that SAMH provided, including a venereal disease clinic. Ferguson-Davie set up training classes, teaching nursing and midwifery.

Ferguson-Davie became an officer of the Order of the British Empire in 1927 and in the same year, retired. She and her husband then moved to South Africa, where he worked at Fort Hare College. Ferguson-Davie died in 1943.

Legacy 
Ferguson-Davie was recognized for her medical work during the St. Andrew's Cathedral's Thanksgiving service in 2013. In 2014, she was inducted into the Singapore Women's Hall of Fame.

References 

1880 births
1943 deaths
People from Singapore
English women medical doctors
Officers of the Order of the British Empire
People from the Eastern Cape
Date of birth missing
20th-century British medical doctors
Christian medical missionaries
Female Christian missionaries
20th-century women physicians
People from Essex (before 1965)
20th-century English women
20th-century English people